Ian Robertson (born 26 April 1951) is a Scottish neuroscientist and clinical psychologist, and Professor of Psychology at Trinity College Dublin.

Life
Ian Robertson is Professor of Psychology at Trinity College, Dublin and founding Director of Trinity College Institute of Neuroscience. Robertson is the first psychologist in Ireland to have been elected a member of the Royal Irish Academy. Robertson also holds the positions of Visiting Professor at University College London, Visiting Professor at Bangor University, University of Wales, and visiting scientist at the Rotman Research Institute, University of Toronto. Robertson was previously a senior scientist at the MRC Cognition and Brain Sciences Unit at the University of Cambridge, where he was also a fellow at Hughes Hall. Robertson sat on the Wellcome Trust Neuroscience and Mental Health Committee from 2006–2011.

Robertson is Director of the NIEL programme (Neuroenhancement for Inequalities in Elder Lives). He was founding director of Trinity College Institute of Neuroscience.

A graduate of Glasgow University, Robertson gained his Masters (Clinical Psychology, Institute of Psychiatry) and Doctoral (Neuropsychology) degrees at the University of London.

Ian Robertson has published over 250 scientific articles in leading journals, including Nature, Brain, Journal of Neuroscience, and Psychological Bulletin. Ian has also contributed to public communication and understanding of science, contributing regularly to The Times and The Daily Telegraph, and he is also a columnist for the British Medical Journal. Robertson is author and editor of ten scientific books, including the leading international textbook on cognitive rehabilitation (Cognitive Neurorehabilitation), and several books for the general reader which have been translated into multiple languages.

Research interests
Ian Robertson's research focuses on behavioural change in people with impaired brain function, through linking novel rehabilitation strategies to underlying models of brain function. Methods which are now widely used and taught internationally include limb activation training for unilateral neglect, sustained attention training for unilateral neglect, and self-alert training for adults with attention deficit hyperactivity disorder. His current research includes several randomized controlled trials of different types of cognitive training with elderly, schizophrenic and ADHD patients. He has also developed with others a widely used method for frontal lobe impairment known as Goal Management Training.

Ian Robertson has also developed a theoretical approach to cognitive rehabilitation and originated some very widely used tests of attention.

Selected publications
The Winner Effect: How Power Affects Your Brain (Bloomsbury, June 2012)

Mind Sculpture: Unleashing Your Brain’s Potential

The Mind's Eye: The Essential Guide to Boosting Your Mental, Emotional and Physical Powers

The Stress Test: How Pressure Can Make You Stronger and Sharper (Bloomsbury, 2016)

References

External links
 Neuroenhancement for Independent Lives
 Trinity College, Dublin - Institute of Neuroscience - Ian Robertson Profile
 The Winner Effect
 Google Scholar profile page for Ian Robertson

British cognitive neuroscientists
Clinical psychologists
Neuropsychologists
Alumni of the University of Glasgow
Scottish educators
Living people
1951 births
People associated with The Institute for Cultural Research
Academics of Trinity College Dublin